The renal hylus (Latin: hylus renale) or renal pedicle is the hylus of the kidney, that is, its recessed central fissure where its vessels, nerves and ureter pass. The medial border of the kidney is concave in the center and convex toward either extremity; it is directed forward and a little downward. Its central part presents a deep longitudinal fissure, bounded by prominent overhanging anterior and posterior lips. This fissure is a hylus that transmits the vessels, nerves, and ureter. From anterior to posterior, the renal vein exits, the renal artery enters, and the renal pelvis exits the kidney.

On the left hand side the hylus is located at the L1 vertebral level and the right kidney at level L1-2. The lower border of the kidneys is usually alongside L3.

Hylus's Order
The superior, middle, and inferior vessels enter or leave the hylus of kidney: from anterior to posterior is renal vein, renal artery and renal pelvis, respectively.

See also
 Renal artery
 Renal vein
 Renal pyramids
 Renal medulla

Additional images

References

External links
 

Kidney anatomy